The Seminar of Galician Studies (SEG) was an institution established in 1923 with the purpose of studying and promoting the Galician cultural heritage.

References

External links
«El Seminario de Estudios Gallegos será restaurado proximamente» ABC, 19 January 1979 .
Aniversario do Seminario de Estudos Galegos Real Academia Galega, 15 October 2013 .

Galician culture
Galician language
Organizations established in 1923
1923 establishments in Spain
1936 disestablishments in Spain